Fudbalski klub Crvena zvezda is a Serbian professional association football club based in Belgrade, Serbia, who currently play in the Serbian SuperLiga. They have played at their current home ground, Red Star Stadium, since 1963.

In Crvena zvezda's history, 43 coaches have coached the club. The first manager was Branislav Sekulić and the current manager is Miloš Milojević, who was appointed on 21 August 2022. Miljan Miljanić had the longest reign as Crvena zvezda coach, with eight consecutive years in charge.

Managers
The following is the list of Red Star Belgrade head coaches and their respective tenures on the bench:

 Branislav Sekulić (1946)
 Svetislav Glišović (1946–48)
 Aleksandar Tomašević (1948–50)
 Ljubiša Broćić (1951)
 Žarko Mihajlović (1951)
 Branislav Sekulić (1952)
 Žarko Mihajlović (1952–53)
 Ljubiša Broćić (1953–54)
 Boško Ralić (1954)
 Milovan Ćirić (1954–57)
 Milorad Pavić (1957–64)
 Ivan Toplak (1964–66)
 Miljan Miljanić (1966–74)
 Miljenko Mihić (1974–75)
 Milovan Ćirić (1975–76)
 Gojko Zec (1976–78)
 Branko Stanković (1978–82)
 Stevan Ostojić (1982–83)
 Gojko Zec (1983–86)
 Velibor Vasović (1986–88)
 Branko Stanković (1988)
 Dragoslav Šekularac (1989–90)
 Ljupko Petrović (1990–91)
 Vladica Popović (1991–92)
 Milan Živadinović (1992–94)
 Ljupko Petrović (1994–96)
 Vladimir Petrović (1996–1997)
 Vojin Lazarević (1997)
 Milorad Kosanović (1997–98)
 Vojin Lazarević (1998–99)
 Miloljub Ostojić (1999)
 Zvonko Radić (caretaker) (1999)
 Slavoljub Muslin (Sept 20, 1999–Sept 30, 2001)
 Zoran Filipović (Oct 5, 2001–June 4, 2003)
 Slavoljub Muslin (June 10, 2003–May 23, 2004)
 Ljupko Petrović (June 8, 2004–Sept 17, 2004)
 Milovan Rajevac (caretaker) (2004)
 Ratko Dostanić (Sept 25, 2004–July 20, 2005)
 Walter Zenga (July 29, 2005–May 30, 2006)
  Dušan Bajević (July 1, 2006–March 10, 2007)
Boško Gjurovski (March 10, 2007–Aug 10, 2007)
 Milorad Kosanović (Aug 10, 2007–Nov 9, 2007)
 Aleksandar Janković (Nov 9, 2007–June 11, 2008)
  Zdeněk Zeman (June 17, 2008–Sept 6, 2008)
 Čedomir Janevski (Sept 10, 2008–May 8, 2009)
  Siniša Gogić (caretaker) (May 8, 2009–May 30, 2009)
 Vladimir Petrović (June 3, 2009–March 21, 2010)
 Ratko Dostanić (March 21, 2010–Aug 6, 2010)
 Aleksandar Kristić (Aug 7, 2010–Dec 7, 2010)
 Robert Prosinečki (Dec 9, 2010–Aug 20, 2012)
 Aleksandar Janković (Aug 21, 2012–March 18, 2013)
 Ricardo Sá Pinto (March 19, 2013–June 19, 2013)
 Slaviša Stojanović (June 24, 2013–June 21, 2014)
 Nenad Lalatović (June 23, 2014–May 24, 2015)
 Miodrag Božović (June 2, 2015–May 7, 2017)
Boško Gjurovski (caretaker) (May 8, 2017–May 27, 2017)
 Vladan Milojević (June 5, 2017–Dec 19, 2019)
 Dejan Stanković (Dec 21, 2019–Aug 26, 2022)
 Miloš Milojević (Aug 26, 2022–present)

Managerial statistics (1966–present)

See also 
 List of KK Crvena zvezda head coaches

References

External links
 Official website

Coaches
 
Red Star Belgrade